Iolaus moyambina, the Sierra Leone fine sapphire, is a butterfly in the family Lycaenidae. It is found in Guinea, Sierra Leone and western Liberia.

References

Butterflies described in 1959
Iolaus (butterfly)